(also sometimes known as ) were Shinto priestesses devoted to the goddess Ame-no-Uzume-no-Mikoto during the Heian period (794–1185) in Japan. Originating as performers of shamanistic rituals performed to appease the souls of the dead,  originally functioned as priestesses designed to deal with death.

History of the term 
 priestesses worshipped the goddess Ame-no-Uzume-no-Mikoto and believed themselves to be her descendants. The myth is as follows:

Amaterasu had a brother by the name of Susano-no-Mikoto. He repeatedly pranked Amaterasu which drove her to hide away in a rock cave. Her retreat brought darkness to the celestial realm and gods gathered at the cave. Ame-no-Uzume-no-Mikoto danced in front of the gathered gods. Divinely possessed, she became half-naked and exposed her breasts and lower body to the crowd. This made the gods burst into laughter. Upon hearing the commotion, Amaterasu peeked out of the cave to quell her curiosity.

Ame-no-Uzume's actions were essentially a shamanistic ritual now interpreted as the archetypal funerary ritual performed to appease the soul of the dead. Before changes in the early 700s,  functioned as priestesses designed to deal with death and the relief of society from potential chaos and communal paralysis. They brought collective renewal in times of loss through transformational magic. From the myth as well as their social function, the archetypal image of  became that of a priestess and entertainer who mediated the worlds of light and darkness, or life and death.

The  had exclusive access to royal coffins during enshrinement. They performed ritual dances and incantations that were passed down secretly through generations. Their rituals were considered crucial for deaths in the imperial court so they were granted immunity from conscript labor and taxes. They also had a distinct naming practice. In contrast to the standard convention during the Heian period, which identified both men and women in name by their parents, office, status, or court occupation,  used personal names. Somewhat similar to stage names, this naming practice indicated  occupied a position outside the hierarchy of the court and patriarchal family.

After the introduction of the Taihō Reform Code of 701 and the Yōrō Code of 718, unsavory views of  emerged. These codes adopted the legal and administrative system of China in attempts to consolidate central government power. Much of China's system was based on Confucianism, and as such many areas of Japan enforced the Confucian ethic of hard work, with a large shift in focus to agriculture production. Since  were exempt from conscripted labor, they did not contribute to agrarian processes and were viewed as non-productive. A section of the Yōrō code describes  as such:

As the Taihō reforms became more entrenched in society, Buddhism took root. Buddhist priests, which consisted of mostly males, took over imperial funerary operations and the  lost their status. Once the center of the religious sphere,  became a part of periphery society.

After being pushed out of their role in funerary proceedings,  women were forced to find a new way to survive which led them to use their traditional dances and songs to survive. This, however, did not provide them enough funds to survive, leading them to turn to prostitution. Despite taking part in sexually explicit acts, societally  were not considered prostitutes as they did not solicit money, only accept gifts. At the time there was no legislation on prostitution in Japan, making it hard to distinguish between prostitutes and sexual partners who received gifts.

- music and prostitution 
After having been forced out of their profession's original focus,  had begun to take up permanent domiciles by the late 11th century. The most fabled  colonies concentrated at Eguchi along the Yodo River. The river served as the main passageway of travel from the inland sea to the capital of Heian-kyō. As the ports became busier with an increase in trade,  performances became more popular. Additionally alongside the river, there were many shrines that people pilgrimaged to, many of these pilgrims took part in and supported the  women. They became so popular that the  describes their quarters as lining the doors of Kanzaki and Kanishima in the Settsu Province.  sometimes visited the homes of patrons but customers could be entertained at dwellings similar to travelers inns located along highways called . Some  even became landowners, a privilege held only by the upper echelons of Heian society. 

 were trained in performing songs of the  genre.  songs had a wide variety of topics that appealed to all audiences: Buddhist doctrines, Buddha and his disciples, Buddhist saints, mountain ascetics, woodcutters, fishermen, gamblers, potters, barrier-keepers, Shinto shrine priestesses, trees, birds, snails, dragonflies, grasshoppers, and clothing. Some of the lyrics of the  come directly from sutras or vignettes of everyday life. The  were sung to the beat of a small drum, but as all that remains of them is their lyrics, little is known of their rhythm or melody. The  became a popular form of music in the Heian courts, which attracted many aristocratic men.

The headmistress would have achieved her status through superior  skills and immense personal charm. She could also be chosen based on wealth or personal connections, as some  came from prominent families who had fallen from power. This role was often passed down hereditarily through mother and daughter. The mistress would work to protect the group members from exploitative customers, maintain group order, and distribute goods as needed amongst members.

Most  transactions were conducted on the water. The average  boat carried at least three members: one principal  who sang while beating a small drum; an apprentice  who looked after her mistress and held a large parasol; and an elderly, retired  in charge of rowing the boat. The reason  could openly solicit to their customers during broad daylight in front of onlookers was because they were considered talented performing artists. Without their musical qualifications, they would have been considered  and had to conduct business according to certain rules.

Having sexual intercourse with an  could be seen as a sacred act, as the  replicated the performance of a wife. One example of this is found within Fujiwara no Akihira's portraits of a lieutenant's family:

Changes in societal perspectives 
In the Kamakura period (1185–1333), many ideas changed about the ethics revolving around  women. Two documents from 1261 by officials at the Kasuga shrine complained that some priests had participated in sexual relations with female pilgrims; these actions were described as evil, and, in 1285, Emperor Go-Uda prohibited men and women from mixing during worship and prevented them from staying overnight. Buddhists however were unwilling to brand women as wrongdoers, instead focusing on the trade resulting in them offering solutions for their pain. In some tales, the  would take vows and achieve rebirth in paradise where others portray  as incarnations of Bodhisattvas. Buddhists began to spread the idea that  would violate men's control over their sexuality and therefore prevent their perusal of enlightenment. There are many testimonies from this time period that speak out against the  women, one example being Prince Genji from The Tale of Genji:

Another example of the changing opinions of the  comes from the poet Saigyō in Senjūshō:

This is held in direct opposition to the prior description of  women by Fujiwara no Akihira in Shinsarugakuki:

and other female entertainers

The men of this group worked at home while the women sang  and practiced prostitution like the  women.  women practiced in different environments than the  working mostly in interior walkways in Aohaka, Sunomata, and Nogami. One of the most well-known men from this group is Ōe no Masafusa (1041–1111), an advisor to Emperor Go-Sanjō (1032–1073) who has one of the best descriptions of  women in his essay :

This dance was first performed in male dress. Along with other female performers, these women quickly grew patronage from elite men in the courts, one of the most famous being Emperor Go-Toba, who, during the Kamakura period, invited many women on excursions and made many of these women his concubines.

Changes in religious beliefs 
In order to ensure business prosperity,  began worshipping the god Hyukudaifu (also called Hyakudayu or Momodayu), generally represented in male form. Hyakudaifu worship is a phallic cult with objects of veneration represented by male genitalia made of wood, paper, or stone.  records say  women kept thousands of these objects. The cultic practice comes from the belief that praying to these objects and honoring Hyakudaifu would ensure continued success in drawing in male customers. This practice of worship, however, went beyond private observance, and  often took pilgrimages to shrines famous for Hyakudaifu practices, like the Hirota Shrine and the Sumiyoshi Shrine. Coincidentally, these shrines also were popular religious destinations for aristocrats from the capital.

Go-Shirakawa 
Emperor Go-Shirakawa (1127–1192) was absorbed with the art of  since he was a young child. During his reign, he fell in love with an  named Tamba-no-tsubone, who became one of his secondary wives. She bore him a prince and makes appearances in his memoirs. He is known for his integral connections to the  art form, spending years cultivating his  skills before and through his reign. It was not unusual for him to forego sleep and endure physical discomforts to master the art. His infatuation caused him to be seen as an anomaly of the court and gave him an unsavory reputation; however, this did not deter him, and he summoned  singers of low social status to the imperial residence, especially , to teach them their art form. Some of these women took part in critical discussions of the imayō art form, showing pride in their profession. This created a dialogue between the upper and lower class and helped restore some status to the asobi community.

One such woman by the name of Kane was the lady-in-waiting for his mother. In the year 1157, he invited an  expert by the name of Otomae, an elderly woman in her 70s, to his court. She came from the most authentic  lineage, and the emperor dedicated his time to relearning the art in its entirety. Every year after Otomae's passing, the emperor would hold a memorial service and sing at the anniversary of her death.

Go-Shirakawa compiled the largest  lyric collection into a book inspired by Otomae: . The book took him two decades to compile, completing the work in 1179. The  is an important document in analyzing ancient culture in Japan.  lyrics are one of the few resources that exists to this day that not only show the viewpoint of elite women, but also allow lower-class women their chance to express themselves and the world around them. The songs speak on the lives of the  women and their thoughts on their profession, the people they meet, and the ideas about gender that surround them daily through stereotypes and prejudices.

Notable historical figures recorded as interacting with  

 Emperor Ichijō ( 986–1011)
 Emperor Go-Sanjō ( 1068–1072)
 Emperor Fujiwara Michinaga (966–1027): Gave favor to an  named Kokannon at Eguchi in the year 1000.
 Yorimichi (992–1074): Fell in love with an  named Nakanogimi at Eguchi in the year 1031.
 Emperor Go-Shirakawa (1127–1192)
 Minamoto Yoritomo (1147–1199)
 Fujiwara Akihira (989–1066)

See also
 Prostitution in Japan

References 

Women of medieval Japan